You Know it's Me is the seventh solo studio album by Scottish singer Barbara Dickson, released in 1981.

This was the second album by Dickson to be produced by Alan Tarney, following the success of the previous one. You Know it's Me wasn't as big a hit however, reaching No.39 in the UK charts and failing to produce a hit single, despite being a firm fan favourite. Singles released from the album were the upbeat "Only Seventeen" and the ballad "My Heart Lies" (which reached No. 36 on the singles chart in The Netherlands).

The album was re-issued on cassette a year later in a double-pack with her 1978 album Sweet Oasis and on Compact disc in 1993.

Track listing 

Side One
 "Think it Over" (Alan Tarney) 3.38
 "Little by Little in Love" (Alan Tarney) 3.41
 "You Know it's Me" (Barbara Dickson) 3.44
 "Hold On" (Alan Tarney) 4.15
 "We'll Believe in Lovin'" (Alan Tarney) 3.43
Side Two
 "Only Seventeen" (Alan Tarney) 4.10
 "You Got Me" (Barbara Dickson, Jeff Seopardie) 3.33
 "I Know You, You Know Me" (Barbara Dickson) 2.53
 "I Believe in You" (Barbara Dickson) 4.25
 "My Heart Lies" (Alan Tarney) 2.25

Personnel 

Musicians: 
Alan Tarney
Trevor Spencer
Jeff Seopardie
Isaac Guillory
Ian Lynn
Gary Twigg
Recorded at Riverside Recordings and R G Jones studios
Engineers - Nick Sykes, Nick Glennie-Smith, Ashley Howe

References 

1981 albums
Barbara Dickson albums
Epic Records albums
Albums produced by Alan Tarney